is a Japanese politician. He is a member of the House of Councillors representing the Tokushima at-large district and a member of the Liberal Democratic Party.

Political career

See also 
 Referendum
 Yoshino River

External links 
  Official website

1952 births
People from Itabashi
People from Tokushima (city)
Living people
Members of the House of Councillors (Japan)
Politicians from Tokyo
Liberal Democratic Party (Japan) politicians
Mayors of places in Japan